Violets Are Blue is a 1986 American romantic drama film directed by Jack Fisk and starring Sissy Spacek and Kevin Kline. The film was distributed by Columbia Pictures.

Plot
After fifteen years of traveling around the world, a famous photographer named Gussie (Spacek) returns to the Maryland coastal resort where she grew up for a two-week break. She meets her high school sweetheart Henry (Kline), now married to a woman he met when he was away at college and running the local newspaper he has inherited from his father. Soon after, an awkward and tension-filled romance ensues.

Cast
Sissy Spacek as Gussie Sawyer
Kevin Kline as Henry Squires
Bonnie Bedelia as Ruth Squires
John Kellogg as Ralph Sawyer
Jim Standiford  as Addy Squires
Augusta Dabney as Ethel Sawyer
Kate McGregor-Stewart as Sara Mae
Annalee Jefferies as Sally
Mike Starr as Tony
Adrian Sparks as George

References

External links

1986 films
1986 romantic drama films
American romantic drama films
Columbia Pictures films
Films scored by Patrick Williams
Films shot in Delaware
Films shot in Baltimore
Films directed by Jack Fisk
1980s English-language films
1980s American films